Samman Guard (English: The Guard of Honour, Hindi: सम्मान गार्ड) is the official slow march of the Indian Army. The music was  composed by L. B. Gurung. It was released under The Gramophone Company of India record label on January 1, 1972 as the last song on the Martial Music Of The Indian Army Vol. 1 Album.

See also 
 India related
 Band of the Brigade of Gurkhas
 Beating retreat in India 
 Deshon Ka Sartaj Bharat
 Indian military bands
 Indian Army Chief's Band
 Military Music Wing
 Music of India
 President's Bodyguard
 Tri-Services Guard of Honour (India)

 Other related
 Guard of honour

References

External links 
 

1972 compositions
1972 songs
Indian military marches